The following lists events that happened during 1944 in Chile.

Incumbents
President of Chile: Juan Antonio Ríos

Events

April
2 April - municipal elections are held, The Democratic Alliance obtains 50.46% of the votes, followed by the Conservative Party with 20.94% and the Liberal Party with 14.10%.

May
21 May – The Naval de Talcahuano football club is founded.

Births 
15 January – Julio Videla (d. 2020)
16 January – Juan Manuel Rodríguez Vega (d. 2021)
14 March – Marta Larraechea
27 March – Miguel Enríquez (politician) (d. 1974)
6 June – Patricio Cornejo
16 July – Leopoldo Vallejos
30 July – Roberto Hodge
9 October – Antonio Arias (footballer)
18 December – Jorge Pinto Rodríguez

Deaths
26 September – Pedro Dartnell (b. 1873)

References 

 
Years of the 20th century in Chile
Chile